Evany Rosen is a Canadian comedian and actress, most noted as a founding member of the comedy troupe Picnicface and as co-creator with Kayla Lorette of the Crave original series New Eden.

Early life and education 
Originally from Ontario, Rosen attended Dalhousie University in Halifax, Nova Scotia, forming Picnicface with several of her friends. The troupe achieved significant success on YouTube before launching a Canadian Comedy Award-winning sketch comedy series on The Comedy Network in 2011.

Career 
Following Picnicface's cancellation, Rosen appeared in the web series Space Janitors, for which she was a Canadian Comedy Award nominee for Best Female Performance in a Web Series at the 15th Canadian Comedy Awards in 2014 and at the 16th Canadian Comedy Awards in 2015. She has also had voice roles in cartoons, including Total Drama Presents: The Ridonculous Race, Winston Steinburger and Sir Dudley Ding Dong, Total DramaRama, Powerbirds, Hotel Transylvania: The Series and Mysticons, and guest appearances in television series including Saving Hope, Workin' Moms, Baroness von Sketch Show and Pretty Hard Cases.

In 2017, she published What I Think Happened: An Underresearched History of the Western World, a book of humorous essays about history.

In 2020, Rosen and Lorette narrated the livestreamed presentation of Craft in Scripted Programming categories for the 8th Canadian Screen Awards. In the same year she was announced as a member of the writing staff for Fort Puleyne, Thomas Middleditch's historical comedy pilot.

Filmography

Film

Television

References

External links

21st-century Canadian actresses
21st-century Canadian comedians
21st-century Canadian essayists
21st-century Canadian women writers
Canadian sketch comedians
Canadian women comedians
Canadian women non-fiction writers
Canadian film actresses
Canadian television actresses
Canadian voice actresses
Canadian web series actresses
Actresses from Ontario
Canadian television writers
Canadian women essayists
Canadian humorists
Living people
Year of birth missing (living people)
Canadian women television writers